Zonulispira chrysochildosa is a species of sea snail, a marine gastropod mollusk in the family Pseudomelatomidae, one of the families commonly known as turrids.

Description
The length of the shell varies between 15 mm and 21 mm.

Distribution
This marine species occurs off Pacific Panama.

References

External links
 
 

chrysochildosa
Gastropods described in 1971